Industry of Croatia plays an important role in the country's economy. It has a longstanding tradition based since the 19th century on agriculture, forestry and mining. Many industrial branches developed at that time, like wood industry, food manufacturing, potash production, shipbuilding, leather and footwear production, textile industry, and others. Today, the industrial sectors in Croatia are food and beverage industry (approx. 24% of total manufacturing industry revenue), metal processing and machine industry, including vehicles (20%), coke and refined petroleum production (17%), chemical, pharmaceutical, rubber and plastics industry (11%), wood, furniture and paper manufacturing (9%), electrical equipment, electronics and optics fabrication (9%), textile, clothing and footwear industry (5%) as well as construction and building materials production (5%).

In the structure of Croatian Gross domestic product (GDP) in 2015, industry's share was 21.2%. Industry's export reached around 10 billion euros in 2015, representing 94.5% of total export. In the same year the industrial production growth rate was 2.6%.

Overview 

Industrial production in Croatia has a most important place in total production. It includes machinery, tools, various fabricated metal products, ships and boats, mineral oils and distillates, timber products, furniture and bed equipment, military hardware, clothing and footwear with accessories, cement, bricks and other building materials, etc. There is also a notable production in energy sector, mining and water supply.

During the process of transition (in the 1990s and later) many companies were closed down, or were damaged during the Croatian War of Independence. It happened mostly to firms of timber, metal and textile branches. Some industries, however, recovered and achieved later remarkable results. Significant production level has been reached in the construction and energy-related activities as well. A great number of companies has been very active in foreign trade.

Following the global financial crisis of 2007–2008, Croatian industry suffered the consequences seen in the decline of production output, revenue growth at a slower pace and unemployment rate increasing. The share of industry in the whole economy sank from year to year; in 2010, for instance, industry accounted for 28.1% of activity. Negative trends were changed not earlier than in 2014, as the industrial production achieved a small rate of growth of 1.3% in comparison with the year before.

In period from 2014 to 2017 industry production grew by 10.8% with average annual growth of 2.7%. 

The annual growth rate of industry production in 2016 rose by 5% .The fastest growth of production in 2016 was recorded by electrical equipment production sector (22.2% in comparison with previous year). At the same time, some industrial branches generated decline of production.

The share of labour force in industry in 2015 was 18.5% of overall employment in Croatia, showing at the same time trends with negative lines.

In 2020 industry production fell by 3.4% in comparison with previous year. In the first half of 2021, industry production grew by 9.6% in comparison to the same period of the previous year.

Industry by counties 

The biggest industrial centres in the Republic of Croatia are Zagreb, Rijeka, Split, Osijek and Varaždin. The share of industrial production output of Croatian counties ranges from over 20% in the City of Zagreb (followed by approx. 11% in Primorje-Gorski Kotar County, 8% in Zagreb County and Varaždin County) to only 0.5% in Lika-Senj County.

Countries with biggest share of industry in GDP in 2018 were Međimurje County (43.5%), Varaždin County (41.7%) and Krapina-Zagorje County (41.3%), while county with lowest share of industry was Dubrovnik-Neretva County (5.2%).

Croatian industry's share of 21.2% of the country's 2015 GDP makes it the second largest sector of the economy after services. Its expected growth is based on larger consumption and foreign investments. Some of the significant investment projects into the energy and environmental protection sector have already been finalized lately.

Industry production growth 2005-2020

Mines and smelters

As early as 1914 Tvonica Karbida I Ferolegura Dalmacija owned a ferrochromium smelter in Dugi Rat.

The Boris Kidric aluminum smelter at Sibenik was completely destroyed as a result of the war for independence that erupted in 1991.

Gallery

See also 

 Economy of the European Union
 Economy of Croatia
 Industry of Romania
 Industry of Bulgaria
 Industry in Finland
 Automotive industry in Croatia

References

External links

Industry – important branch of Croatian economy
 Croatia industries
 Industrial sectors attractive for investors 
Industrial policy in Croatia
Results of a 2015 Faculty of Economy in Zagreb research on production in Croatia (Croatian)
 Industry production in Croatia
Official export figures
GDP Statistical industrial production in 2015